Nine of Swords is a tribute album by Scott Appel that contains compositions by and about Nick Drake.

Track listing 
 "Bird Flew By" – (Nick Drake)
 "Somnus" – (Scott Appel)
 "Blur" – (Scott Appel)
 "Nearly" – (Scott Appel/Nick Drake)
 "Far Leys" 
 "Blossom" – (Nick Drake)
 "Our Season" – (Nick Drake)
 "Nine of Swords" – (Scott Appel)
 "Place to Be" – (Nick Drake)
 "Thanatopsis" – (Scott Appel)
 "Parasite" – (Nick Drake)
 "Spencer the Rover" – (Traditional)
 "Silent Snow" – (Scott Appel)
 "Song for Ireland" – (June Colclough/Phil Colclough/Dick Colclough)

References 

1988 albums
Nick Drake tribute albums
Scott Appel albums